Old World monkeys are all simian primates. They are more closely related to the apes than they are to the New World monkeys.

Taxonomic classification 

 Infraorder Simiiformes
 Parvorder Catarrhini
 Superfamily Cercopithecoidea
 Family Cercopithecidae: Old World monkeys
 Subfamily Cercopithecinae
 Tribe Cercopithecini
 Genus Allenopithecus
 Genus Miopithecus
 Genus Erythrocebus
 Genus Chlorocebus
 Genus Cercopithecus
 Genus Allochrocebus
 Tribe Papionini
 Genus Macaca 
 Genus Lophocebus
 Genus Rungwecebus
 Genus Papio
 Genus Theropithecus
 Genus Cercocebus
 Genus Mandrillus
 Subfamily Colobinae
 African group
 Genus Colobus
 Genus Piliocolobus
 Genus Procolobus
 Langur (leaf monkey) group
 Genus Semnopithecus
 Genus Trachypithecus
 Genus Presbytis
 Odd-nosed group
 Genus Pygathrix
 Genus Rhinopithecus
 Genus Nasalis
 Genus Simias

Key

Extant species

Subfamily: Cercopithecinae

Tribe: Cercopithecini

Tribe: Papionini

Subfamily: Colobinae

African group

Langur group

Odd-nosed group

See also
List of New World monkey species

References 

Old World monkeys